Dahu Park is a park in Neihu District, Taipei, Taiwan.

History
The park was constructed in 1979.

Architecture
The park has a 13-hectare lake crossed by the Jindai Bridge. It also has a heated swimming pool, steam room, sauna, water slide, and other facilities.

Transportation
The park is accessible from Dahu Park Station of the Taipei Metro.

See also
 List of parks in Taiwan
 List of tourist attractions in Taiwan

References

1979 establishments in Taiwan
Parks established in 1979
Parks in Taipei
Lakes of Taiwan